Rowley Regis railway station serves the town of Blackheath and the Rowley Regis area of Sandwell, in the county of West Midlands, England.  It is located on the Birmingham to Worcester via Kidderminster Line.  The station is managed by West Midlands Railway, who provide the majority of train services; there are also occasional services provided by Chiltern Railways.

History
The station was opened in 1867 by the Great Western Railway on their line from Birmingham to Stourbridge Junction and was known as Rowley Regis & Blackheath until 1968. Goods facilities were withdrawn on 1 July 1963.

Services
During Monday to Saturday daytimes, there are six trains per hour in each direction, operated by West Midlands Railway, between Birmingham Snow Hill and Stourbridge Junction.  Many of these continue beyond Stourbridge to Kidderminster, Worcester Foregate Street or Great Malvern, and beyond Birmingham to Whitlocks End, Stratford-upon-Avon, Dorridge or Leamington Spa.  During the evenings and on Sundays, there are typically two trains per hour.

There are also five trains per day in both directions during peak periods to/from London Marylebone, provided by Chiltern Railways.

References

Further reading

External links

Rail Around Birmingham and the West Midlands: Rowley Regis station

Railway stations in Sandwell
DfT Category E stations
Former Great Western Railway stations
Railway stations in Great Britain opened in 1867
Railway stations served by Chiltern Railways
Railway stations served by West Midlands Trains
Rowley Regis